Justin Shaun Rodriguez Chua (born July 13, 1989) is a Filipino professional basketball player for the TNT Tropang Giga of the Philippine Basketball Association (PBA). He plays the center and power forward positions. He was the former star player of Chiang Kai Shek College during his high school days. He played for the Ateneo de Manila University before being selected tenth overall in the 2013 PBA draft by San Mig Super Coffee Mixers.

Early life and high school career 
Chua was born in Manila but grew up in Bacolod City. He first played basketball in Trinity Christian School in Bacolod. He then moved back to Manila when he played for the Chiang Kai Shek Dragons in the Tiong Lian Basketball Association (now defunct). At the time, he played more inside and took less jump shots. He had 15 points, 17 rebounds, and 10 rebounds in one game. His team won a championship over the Xavier School Stallions.

College career 
Chua's college career started off slow, as he averaged only 0.8 points, 1.6 rebounds, and 0.8 assists in his rookie season, and  2.1 points, 1.8 rebounds and 0.2 assists in his second season. He was able to experience Ateneo's back-to-back championships during that time as a backup to Rabeh Al-Hussaini.

In 2010, Chua got his first college start against a smaller UST Growling Tigers team. He scored the first six points of the game for the Eagles, then had eight points and two blocks in the last six minutes of the game, finishing with 17 points, 11 rebounds, and 4 blocks in the win. He became known as a reliable big man lefty who could shoot jumpers. Ateneo won its third straight championship that year over the FEU Tamaraws.

In Season 75, Ateneo began its "Drive For 5" campaign. In Ateneo's win against FEU, FEU forward Arvie Bringas was caught spitting towards Chua. Bringas was thrown out of the game and FEU suspended him for their next two games. Chua stepped up his play when Ateneo lost its center JP Erram to a knee injury. Ateneo won in the Finals again, in two games. They became the first UAAP team to ever complete a five-peat.

Professional career

PBA D-League 
Chua played for Blackwater Sports in the PBA D-League. He had 17 points in each of the two games of the Finals to help the Elite sweep the four-time defending champions NLEX Road Warriors in the 2013 Foundation Cup.

GlobalPort Batang Pier 
Chua was selected tenth overall in the 2013 PBA draft by San Mig Super Coffee Mixers. He was among six Ateneo players taken in that draft, along with Greg Slaughter, Ryan Buenafe, Nico Salva, Erram, and Chris Sumalinog. Just two days after the draft, he was traded to the GlobalPort Batang Pier along with Leo Najorda to acquire the rights of Globalport's No. 7 pick overall, Isaac Holstein. In GlobalPort's match vs San Mig, he had a costly turnover that lost them the game.

San Miguel Beermen 
After they ended their disappointing campaign in the Commissioner's Cup, GlobalPort traded him to the San Miguel Beermen for Yousef Taha. He joined a frontcourt that included June Mar Fajardo and Doug Kramer. He had just 2 points as he also had three fouls in his debut for the Beermen. He was able to win the 2014-15 Philippine Cup in his time there.

Barako Bull Energy 
In 2015, Chua moved to the Barako Bull Energy in a trade that also involved big men Dorian Peña and Jay-R Reyes and SMB's 2017 1st round pick. In the 2015 Governors' Cup, he had 12 points in a win over the Bolts.

Meralco Bolts 
After his rookie scale contract expired, he agreed to a new contract with the Meralco Bolts. There, he was reunited with his former college coach Norman Black. He had an ACL injury, which impacted his opportunities to play. In the 2017 Commissioner's Cup, he scored all six of his points in the fourth quarter to turn a close game against NLEX into a blowout win. He then had a career-high 14 points while defending import Cory Jefferson in a win over the Alaska Aces.

First stint with TNT KaTropa 
On September 11, 2017, Chua was traded to the TNT KaTropa in exchange of a 2019 second round pick. He only played four games for them.

Phoenix Fuel Masters

2017–2018 
Chua was traded to the TNT KaTropa during the 2017 PBA Draft along with Sidney Onwubere for Jonjon Gabriel and Phoenix's 2019 second round pick. In 2018, he participated in the Obstacle Challenge during All-Star Week.

2019–2021 
In the 2019 Philippine Cup, he had a new career-high of 24 points while also grabbing six rebounds against the Bolts. Phoenix could have lost the game in overtime as he missed a game-winning jumper, but his teammate Calvin Abueva was there to rebound the miss and score. The following game, he was punched in the fist by TNT player Michael Miranda. Miranda was then fined P30,000 and suspended for one game. Once again, he also participated in the Obstacle Challenge of that year's All-Star Weekend. That conference, Phoenix made its first-ever semifinals. In the semifinals, they lost to the Beermen in five games out of a best-of-seven series, with him having 18 points and 11 rebounds in the Game 5 loss. In the Commissioner's Cup, he scored a game-winning layup against the Aces.

During the pandemic, Chua prepared for the 2020 season by working on his shooting and by doing plyometrics. Before the season started, interim coach Topex Robinson was made permanent head coach. In the 2020 Philippine Cup, he had a breakout campaign. He started his season with 17 points in a win against Meralco. In a close win over NLEX, he hit two clutch free throws that sealed the win. He had a career-high 17 rebounds against the Beermen. Then, he had 11 rebounds and 5 blocks against the Blackwater Elite. He finished the elimination round with a double-double of 21 points and 10 rebounds against the Rain or Shine Elastopainters. With Coach Robinson's belief, his scoring, three-point shooting, rebounding, and shot-blocking all saw improvement, making him a candidate for the Most Improved Player. They edged the Magnolia Hotshots in the first round, but its finals aspirations fell short as the Fuel Masters lost to the TNT Katropa in the knockout game of the semifinals. Prince Caperal won Most Improved Player over him. But he won the Top Bubble D-Fender award, as he led the league with 1.6 blocks.

In the 2021 Philippine Cup, he had a near double-double of 17 points and nine rebounds. In the Governors' Cup on Christmas Day, he had 19 points in a win against NLEX.

NLEX Road Warriors 
During the 2021 Governors' Cup, the NLEX Road Warriors traded Kris Porter and two draft picks for Chua. When they traded for him, Coach Yeng Guiao compared him to a younger J.R. Quiñahan. He had 15 points on three triples in his winning debut over Ginebra.

Second stint with TNT Tropang Giga
On January 18, 2023, Chua was traded back to the TNT Tropang Giga in a three-team trade involving TNT, NLEX, and Phoenix Super LPG Fuel Masters.

PBA career statistics

As of the end of 2021 season

Season-by-season averages
 
|-
| align=left rowspan=2| 
| align=left | GlobalPort
| rowspan=2|29 || rowspan=2|10.7 || rowspan=2|.383 || rowspan=2|.250 || rowspan=2|.641 || rowspan=2|2.3 || rowspan=2|.4 || rowspan=2|.2 || rowspan=2|.3 || rowspan=2|3.7
|-
| align=left | San Miguel
|-
| align=left rowspan=2| 
| align=left | San Miguel
| rowspan=2|27 || rowspan=2|5.9 || rowspan=2|.250 || rowspan=2|.000 || rowspan=2|.789 || rowspan=2|1.3 || rowspan=2|.2 || rowspan=2|.3 || rowspan=2|.2 || rowspan=2|1.6
|-
| align=left | Barako Bull
|-
| align=left | 
| align=left | Meralco
| 2 || 1.5 || .500 || — || — || .0 || .0 || .0 || .0 || 1.0
|-
| align=left rowspan=2| 
| align=left | Meralco
| rowspan=2|28 || rowspan=2|10.9 || rowspan=2|.330 || rowspan=2|.167 || rowspan=2|.808 || rowspan=2|1.9 || rowspan=2|.3 || rowspan=2|.1 || rowspan=2|.1 || rowspan=2|3.4
|-
| align=left | TNT
|-
| align=left | 
| align=left | Phoenix
| 34 || 14.7 || .456 || — || .646 || 3.7 || .5 || .6 || .4 || 6.1
|-
| align=left | 
| align=left | Phoenix
| 39 || 21.4 || .420 || .231 || .767 || 4.4 || .6 || .4 || .7 || 8.9
|-
| align=left | 
| align=left | Phoenix
| 17 || 27.6 || .367 || .345 || .822 || 6.6 || 1.5 || .6 || 1.6 || 11.6
|-
| align=left rowspan=2| 
| align=left | Phoenix
| rowspan=2|26 || rowspan=2|18.7 || rowspan=2|.376 || rowspan=2|.281 || rowspan=2|.885 || rowspan=2|4.0 || rowspan=2|.5 || rowspan=2|.4 || rowspan=2|.4 || rowspan=2|6.8
|-
| align=left | NLEX
|-
|-class=sortbottom
| align=center colspan=2 | Career
| 202 || 15.2 || .391 || .301 || .754 || 3.3 || .5 || .4 || .5 || 5.8

National team career 
He was a part of the Gilas Pilipinas window for the February window of the 2021 Fiba Asia Cup qualifiers as a replacement for Japeth Aguilar.

References

1989 births
Living people
Ateneo Blue Eagles men's basketball players
Barako Bull Energy players
Basketball players from Manila
Centers (basketball)
Filipino men's basketball players
Magnolia Hotshots draft picks
Meralco Bolts players
NLEX Road Warriors players
NorthPort Batang Pier players
Philippines men's national basketball team players
Phoenix Super LPG Fuel Masters players
Power forwards (basketball)
San Miguel Beermen players
TNT Tropang Giga players